The Aurora Awards are granted annually by the Canadian SF and Fantasy Association and SFSF Boreal Inc. The Award for Best Novel was first awarded in 1982 as the Award for Best Outstanding Work and is two awards, one granted to an English-language work and one to a French-language work. Until 1989 it was dedicated to any works, including non-novel length works. It became a dedicated category in 1989 as the Award for Best Long Form (French: Meilleur Livre). It became the Award for Best Novel (French: Meilleur Roman) in 2011, when the Prix Aurora and Prix Boreal combined. No winner was awarded in 1983 and 1986, but shortlists were created.

Robert J. Sawyer has won the English-language award the most times (eight times), and Élisabeth Vonarburg has won the French-language award the most times (seven times).

English-language Award

Winners and nominees

  *   Winners and joint winners

Best of the Decade

A special award was handed out in 2017 for the best novel or series of the 2000s. If continued, this award will be given out once every 10 years.

  *   Winners and joint winners

French-language Award

Winners and nominees

  *   Winners and joint winners

References

Canadian speculative fiction awards
Aurora Awards